Parkway is a neighborhood in Sacramento, California. The 2010 United States census reported Parkway's population was 14,670.

Prior to the 2010 United States census, Parkway was grouped with Fruitridge Pocket and Lemon Hill in the Parkway-South Sacramento, California CDP.

Geography
According to the United States Census Bureau, the CDP covers an area of 2.4 square miles (6.3 km), all of it land.

Demographics
At the 2010 census Parkway had a population of 14,670. The racial makeup of Parkway was 5,225 (35.6%) White, 2,696 (18.4%) African American, 182 (1.2%) Native American, 1,997 (13.6%) Asian, 300 (2.0%) Pacific Islander, 3,161 (21.5%) from other races, and 1,109 (7.6%) from two or more races. Hispanic or Latino of any race were 6,185 persons (42.2%).

The census reported that 14,613 people (99.6% of the population) lived in households, 57 (0.4%) lived in non-institutionalized group quarters, and no one was institutionalized.

There were 4,583 households, 2,078 (45.3%) had children under the age of 18 living in them, 1,860 (40.6%) were opposite-sex married couples living together, 1,043 (22.8%) had a female householder with no husband present, 424 (9.3%) had a male householder with no wife present.  There were 393 (8.6%) unmarried opposite-sex partnerships, and 43 (0.9%) same-sex married couples or partnerships. 977 households (21.3%) were one person and 350 (7.6%) had someone living alone who was 65 or older. The average household size was 3.19.  There were 3,327 families (72.6% of households); the average family size was 3.69.

The age distribution was 4,615 people (31.5%) under the age of 18, 1,642 people (11.2%) aged 18 to 24, 4,011 people (27.3%) aged 25 to 44, 2,959 people (20.2%) aged 45 to 64, and 1,443 people (9.8%) who were 65 or older.  The median age was 29.7 years. For every 100 females, there were 96.8 males.  For every 100 females age 18 and over, there were 93.2 males.

There were 5,036 housing units at an average density of 2,082.7 per square mile, of the occupied units 2,113 (46.1%) were owner-occupied and 2,470 (53.9%) were rented. The homeowner vacancy rate was 3.9%; the rental vacancy rate was 9.7%.  6,107 people (41.6% of the population) lived in owner-occupied housing units and 8,506 people (58.0%) lived in rental housing units.

References

Census-designated places in Sacramento County, California
Census-designated places in California